The Prince Albert Mintos are a Canadian ice hockey team that plays in the Saskatchewan Male U18 AAA Hockey League (SMAAAHL).  Their home rink is the Art Hauser Centre (formerly known as the Communiplex).
The Prince Albert Mintos won the Telus Cup and Western Canadian Regionals back to back years starting in the 2005–2006 season and 2006–2007 year.  They won the Telus Cup and Western Canadian Regionals for the third time in 2013–2014 season.

History

1800s–1911

The Mintos team is named after a district in Scotland.  But back in the 19th century, the land was controlled by a baron without a proper name of distinction. They decided to call him the Earle of Minto, or Lord Minto.

In 1884 the fourth Earle of Minto was working together with General Middleton in the Riel rebellion before being named governor general of Canada in 1904.

Canada was looking for different ways of showing unification and national identity at that time and as such, sports and pastimes became very popular.  Any of the sports that really started to grow and catch on, a lot of the politicians got behind them and supported them because it helped promote national unity and identity in Canada as a young country.

The Stanley Cup was provided by Lord Stanley at around this time period, as well as the Grey Cup.  Those politicians through that era tried to promote and support sports and that’s why a lot of our national trophies are connected to high-profile politicians.

At this time the Minto Cup was made by Lord Minto, which is still a junior national lacrosse trophy.  The link wasn’t just between politicians and trophies, but between politicians and teams as well.

In 1909, there was a senior hockey team in Prince Albert and they called themselves the Mintos.  The Mintos were then allowed to compete for the Stanley Cup in 1911 due to being deemed as a professional teams as they had to paid players on the roster.

The Mintos went to Winnipeg in 1911 and played off against Port Arthur, winners of the New Ontario Hockey League. They fell in defeat in straight games. Port Arthur would go on to lose a challenge series for the Stanley Cup to the Ottawa Senators of the National Hockey Association.

The Mintos senior team would stay afloat until the 1930s, then changed into a junior team.

1912

The Mintos franchise in 1912 had seven men made up the team that season.  They were: Bruce Wright, Archie MacDonald, Jim Sims, Jim Leach, Gordon Forbes, and Alf Holman.  They would go on to fight Melville for the Allan Cup.  The end result was that the Melville beat the Mintos 9–8 and it was the closest any Prince Albert hockey team would come to winning the Allan Cup.

1928

The Mintos team would make its mark in 1928.  It consisted of Larivell, Valois, Ashwin, Woodman, Hoffman, and Sinclair.  According to the city of Prince Albert website, the match to remember was the night they played the Moose Jaw Maroons for the Henderson Cup.  Around 1,800 jam packed the old Mintos Arena, which was located on the west end of Prince Albert by the old railroad bridge.    Fans unable to get seats inside the stadium almost completely tore down the south wall of the arena in order to watch the memorial struggle.  The Mintos would go on to beat the Maroons 6–4 and claim the Henderson Cup.

1932–1933

Four years later in the 1932–1933 hockey season the Mintos consisted of George Freeland, Scotty Milne, Mac MacFee, Red Hemmerling, George Freeland, Al Fowlie, Todd Klein, Bob McQuarrie, Jack Brown, Jack Dundas, Don Deacon, and Fred Mosher.  This Minto teams was the third team to represent Prince Albert and area with distinction.  This team would win the Northern League but they would fall in defeat to Regina in the playoffs, who would go on to win the Allan Cup.

1949–1950

The next Mintos team would see action in the 1949–1950 season.  The roster at that time included: Wayne Stephenson, Joe Palyga, Ron Clearwater, Hermie Merkowsky, Jim Wilson, Herb Jeffery, Chuck Holdaway, Harry Harasyn, Jack Drew, Don Crawford, and Bill Hunter.  This would be one of the best Mintos teams to date that Prince Albert had.  They would go on to win the Northerns by beating Flin Flon in three straight games.  They would even go as far as winning the British Columbia and Alberta championships.

Late 1940s–1960s

In the time period of the late 1940s to the 1960s, they were a Junior A hockey team and played in the Saskatchewan Junior Hockey League (SJHL).

The 1960–1961 roster included the first French speaking Quebecer ever to have played in the SJHL. His name was Jacques Beaulieu and came from Trois-Rivières, Quebec. Some of his linemates included Pat Donnely, Nick Balon and Jim Neilson, who had a great career with the New York Rangers.

1961 fire of Minto Arena

An arena was built in Prince Albert in the mid-20th century and decided to call it Minto Arena.  Minto Arena burned down in 1961 and without adequate funds to build another there would be no Mintos in Prince Albert for ten years.

1972

The present day Western Hockey League franchise of the Prince Albert Raiders were formed as a provincial Junior A team in 1972.  A contest was then held to pick a name for the name the team.  The winner was in fact Mintos.  Due to a gentleman buying the original Mintos club, they changed the name to Raiders which was the second name.  After a number of years a couple of local men were granted permission to start a team, which they called the Prince Albert Midget Raider Mintos.

The reason the Raider name was in there is because the original Midget AAA hockey team was administered by the Junior Raiders team.

1995

In 1995, the minor hockey association of Prince Albert took over the Mintos Midget team and the Raiders name was dropped, making them the Prince Albert AAA Midget Mintos.

The Midget AAA Mintos have not been in operation all that long, but the Mintos name has been in Prince Albert since 1909

2005–2006

In the 2005–2006 hockey season, the Mintos finished second in the SMAAAHL with an overall record of 31–9–3–1 en route to their first Saskatchewan Major AAA Hockey League title in franchise history.  They lost twice in the playoffs en route to winning the provincial title.  At the Western Regional Championships they went undefeated and earned the right to represent Western Canada at the 2006 Telus Cup, the Canadian National Midget AAA hockey tournament held in Charlottetown, Prince Edward Island.  Throughout the round robin and playoff portions of the tournament they finished undefeated and earned a spot in the tournament final.  The Mintos defeated the Pacific Regional representatives, the Calgary Buffaloes, in triple overtime by a score of 5–4.  Ron Myers, the captain during the 2005–2006 season, recorded the overtime game-winning goal.

Assistant Mintos captain for the 2005–2006 season Matthew Robertson was awarded the top forward at the Telus Cup.  Robertson scored 12 goals, breaking the previous record held by Sidney Crosby.  Crosby scored 11 goals at the 2002 tournament (known as the Air Canada Cup at the time) as a member of the Dartmouth Subways.  Robertson scored 33 per cent of the Mintos' 39 goals while Crosby only scored 30 per cent of his team's.

2006–2007
In the 2006–2007 campaign, the Mintos finished the season with a record of 35–7–1–1, an improvement over their record from the previous season.  The Mintos finished the playoffs with a 9–4 record and won the provincial Saskatchewan Midget AAA Hockey title for the second consecutive season.  They went on to the Western Regional Championships and once again remained undefeated, leading to a berth in the 2007 Telus Cup, held in Red Deer, Alberta. The Mintos faced the host Red Deer Optimist Rebels, and won the final game by a score of 3–2 in double overtime, with the goal being scored by forward Ryan Fox, of Creighton, Saskatchewan.  With their victory, the Mintos became the first team in the history of the national championship to win in consecutive seasons.  They also extended their Telus Cup record undefeated streak to 14 games.

2014
The Mintos won the 2014 Telus Cup.  They beat the Chateauguay Grenadiers in triple overtime.  It marks the longest game in Telus Cup history at 108 minutes and 36 seconds. This is also the third national championship for the Mintos.

NHL alumni
These are the former Prince Albert Mintos alumni who either signed with a team in or went on to play in the NHL.

Kelly Guard
Connor Ingram
Josh Manson
Robyn Regehr
Dustin Tokarski

The Rebellion Hockey / Optimist Ice Mania Tournament
Since 1986, Ice Mania has been running in Prince Albert for AAA midget hockey.  Teams from all over Western Canada compete in this event.

Ice Mania winners
1986 – Notre Dame Hounds
1987 – Edmonton Leafs
1988 – Prince Albert Midget Raiders
1989 – Medicine Hat Tigers
1990 – Calgary Buffaloes
1991 – Sherwood Park
1992 – Pembina Valley Hawks
1993 – Saskatoon Blazers
1994 – Saskatoon Contacts
1995 – Saskatoon Blazers
1996 – Saskatoon Blazers
1997 – Calgary Flames
1998 – Pembina Valley Hawks
1999 – Leduc Autoworld Oil Kings
2000 – Beardy's Blackhawks
2001 – Tisdale Trojans
2002 – Tisdale Trojans
2003 – Tisdale Trojans
2004 – Notre Dame Hounds
2005 – Notre Dame Hounds
2006 – Moose Jaw Warriors
2007 – Lethbridge Y's Men

Ice Mania awards
These are the awards given out annually at the Ice Mania tournament.
Sponsored By Rebellion Hockey Canada
Legend: Name, Number, Team, Year

Top Goaltender

Jordan Ramstead – 35 – Leduc Oil Kings – 2001
Mark Kehrig – 25 – Tisdale Trojans – 2002 
Real Cyr – 35 – Prince Albert Mintos – 2003 
Kent Morrison – 35 – Moose Jaw Warriors – 2004 
Kieran Millan – 1 – Edmonton Gregg Dist – 2005
Matt Weninger – 1 – Lethbridge Titans – 2006

Top Defencemen

Brett Carson – 6 – Yorkton Parkland Mallers – 2001
Bretton Stamler – 7 – Sherwood Park Kings – 2002
Ryan White – 7 – Edmonton CAC Gregg – 2003
David Filiou – 5 – Notre Dame Hounds – 2004
Tommy Brown – 10 – Prince Albert Mintos – 2005 
Bo Montgomery – 2 – Moose Jaw Warriors – 2006

Most Sportsmanlike Player

Josh Sim – 29 – Beardy's Blackhawks – 2001
Brad Erickson – 10 – Saskatoon Blazers – 2002
Matt Hill – 10 – Tisdale Trojans – 2003
Taylor Procyshen – 21 – Moose Jaw Warriors – 2004
Torrey Lindsay – 20 – Interlake Lightning – 2005
Pat Sitko – 18 – Notre Dame Hounds – 2006

Top Scorer

Kurtis Kisio – 11 – Calgary Flames – 2001
Brad Cooper – 12 – Dallas AAA Stars – 2002
Jeff Swain – 19 – Beardy's Blackhawks – 2003
Matthew Robertson – 15 – Prince Albert Mintos – 2004
Dustyn Clegg – 12 – Interlake Lightning – 2005
Braden Pimm – 11 – Notre Dame Hounds – 2006

Most Valuable Player

Tommy Green – 26 – Saskatoon Blazers – 2001
Brad Cooper – 12 – Dallas AAA Stars – 2002
Jordan Knackstedt – 20 – Beardys Blackhawks – 2003
Collin Long – 9 – California Wave – 2004
Keldon Sanderson –  55 – Beardy's Blackhawks – 2005
Michael Small – 9 – Edmonton SSAC – 2006

Results

Exhibition results
Legend:T = Tie, OTL = Overtime Loss

Regular Season results
Legend:T = Tie, OTL = Overtime Loss, SOL = Shootout Loss

Regionals
Legend: T = Tie

Ice Mania results
Legend:
T = Tie

References

External links
Mintos official website

Ice hockey teams in Saskatchewan
Sport in Prince Albert, Saskatchewan